The Arab Fund for Economic and Social Development (AFESD) is a Kuwait-based pan-Arab development finance institution. All member-states of the Arab League are members of the AFESD.  As of 2003, it held around US$7.3 billion in assets.

The AFESD was established by agreement of the Economic and Social Council of the Arab League.  Its first meeting was held on 6 February 1972.

The current Chairman is Abdulatif Y Al-Hamad.

Former Chairman is Mohammed Al Emadi.

Founding Chairman is Saeb N. Jaroudi.

See also
Arab Monetary Fund
Council of Arab Economic Unity
Economic and Social Council (Arab League)

References

External links
Arab Fund for Economic and Social Development
afc.com.lb
untreaty.un.org
un.org

Arab League
Economy of the Arab League
Organizations established in 1972